Taieri Aerodrome  is an aerodrome 2.7 NM (5 km) west of Dunedin, New Zealand.

History

Taieri Aerodrome was the most southerly Royal New Zealand Air Force flying station during World War II. No. 1 Elementary Flying School, No. 307 Elementary Ground Training School and a flight which managed stored Lockheed Hudsons were located there.

Present day
Taieri Aerodrome is home to the Otago Aero Club, New Zealand's oldest aero club, being established in 1927. In addition to being a social organisation, the aero club offers flying school. There are also a number of businesses that operate from the airfield, including those that specialise in maintenance and aircraft restoration. These include Southair Aviation (GA aircraft maintenance provider), Custom Aviation (light aircraft maintenance and construction), Heliotago, and Highland Helicopters.

The aerodrome is host to the popular biennial Wings & Wheels day, which sees a variety of aircraft and vintage cars on display.

Operational information
Taieri has four grass runway vectors 05/23 and 11/29.

Avgas is available via Z Energy swipecard, east of northern end RWY 05 and Jet A1 is available from HeliOtago.

See also

 List of airports in New Zealand
 List of airlines of New Zealand
 Transport in New Zealand

References

External links
 The Otago Aero Club Website
 Taieri (NZTI) Aerodrome Information Chart

Transport in Dunedin
Buildings and structures in Otago
Transport buildings and structures in Otago